Dysschema innominatum is a moth of the family Erebidae first described by Vitor Osmar Becker in 2013. It is restricted to southern Brazil, ranging from northern Rio Grande do Sul, to the mountains of Rio de Janeiro.

The length of the forewings is 22–25 mm for males. The forewings have a black pattern. The hindwings are bordered by black with enclosed white dots between the cells and bordered with red internally.

Etymology
The species name is derived from Latin innominatus (meaning nameless).

References

Moths described in 2013
Dysschema